Big Time Rush in Concert was the debut concert tour by American boy band, Big Time Rush. Visiting the U.S., Germany, and the U.K., the tour supported their debut album, BTR. The majority of the tour performed at several radio festivals, state fairs and amusement parks with about 20,000 spectators. The trek began in April 2011, and ended in December.

Critical reception
The tour received positive praise from music critics. Many commented on their energetic performance and interaction with fans. At the Stanislaus County Fair, Deke Farrow (The Modesto Bee) writes it was the largest concert crowd at the fair. He goes on to say, "And outside the stage area, where there was no way they could see the band, little girls on their dads' shoulders looked just as thrilled as if they were in the front row. Experiencing a big-time rush indeed".

John J. Moser (The Morning Call) states the show at The Great Allentown Fair was filled with energy sensitivity, fantasy, connectivity, musicality and brevity. He continues, "It was refreshing that in an age where lip-synching is readily accepted, the members of Big Time Rush really sang, taking turns on lead vocals. They all were competent, and even pleasant, singers". At the Allegan County Fair, Kelle Barr (Kalamazoo Gazette) noted the shows was crowd pleasing for fans and their parents. She also says, "With sharp looks, smooth harmonies and melodies — let alone their electric, synchronized dancing — BTR may be the resurrection of the boy band. Just maybe".

Cathalena E. Burch (Arizona Daily Star) gave high praise of the show at the Arizona State Fair. During the show, she expressed how the concrete shook from the thousands of screaming girls. She further comments, "Their stage show is choreographed to the most minor details, from the infectious, cardio-pumping dance moves to inviting an audience member to join them in their acoustic set. Even the adults in the audience, the parents taking their young kids to their first-ever concert, were bopping and fist pumping, singing along without missing a word".

Opening acts
Days Difference (North America, select dates)
Hot Chelle Rae (North America, select dates)
New Hollow (Eureka, Fairlea and New Albany)
Greyson Chance (New Albany)

Setlist
"Untitled I" (contains elements of "We Will Rock You") (Instrumental Introduction)
"Famous"
"Big Time Rush"
"Til I Forget About You"
"Big Night"
"Stuck"
"I Want to Hold Your Hand"  (The Beatles cover)
"Worldwide"
"Untitled II" (Video Interlude)
"Nothing Even Matters"
"If I Ruled the World"
"Any Kind of Guy"
"Boyfriend"
"City Is Ours"
Encore
"Halfway There"
Source:

Tour dates

External links
Big Time Rush website

Notes

References

2011 concert tours
Big Time Rush concert tours